Neeyo Njaano is a 1979 Indian Malayalam-language film, directed by P. Chandrakumar and produced by M. Mani. The film stars MG Soman, Sukumaran and Ambika in the lead roles. The film has musical score by Shyam.

Cast
 
M. G. Soman  as Damu
Sukumaran as Prasad
Ambika as Geetha
Jagathy Sreekumar as Kaalan Muthu 
Sankaradi as Govindaswami Gunder
Kottarakkara Sreedharan Nair as Mayandi
Meena as Akkaal
Paravoor Bharathan  as Sankara Pilla
Priya as Rakkamma
Pushpa as Santha

Soundtrack
The music was composed by Shyam and the lyrics were written by Sathyan Anthikkad.

References

External links
 

1979 films
1970s Malayalam-language films
Films directed by P. Chandrakumar